Count George Zápolya de Szepes (c. 1488 – 29 August 1526) was a Hungarian magnate, son of Palatine Stephen Zápolya and younger brother of King John I of Hungary (János Zápolya). He served as Hereditary Lord Lieutenant (Count; supremus et perpetuus comes) of Szepes County.

Background

He was relegated to the political life besides his brother. He was commander of the Hungarian Royal Army, along with Archbishop of Kalocsa Pál Tomori, at the Battle of Mohács, where he disappeared and presumably died.

Court chaplain Miklós Tatai believed that Zápolya murdered King Louis II of Hungary, who escaped from the battle, in the house of the vicar in Dunaszekcső. Historians do not accept this report as credible.

See also 
List of people who disappeared

Bibliography 
 Károly Kiss (ed.): Mohács emlékezete. Európa Könyvkiadó, Budapest 1979. 80–81. old.

References

1488 births
1526 deaths
15th-century Hungarian people
16th-century Hungarian people
15th-century Polish people
16th-century Polish people
Hungarian people of Polish descent
Missing person cases in Hungary
People from Spišská Nová Ves District
George